Daniel Germain,  (born 1964) is a Canadian philanthropist. He is president and founder of the Breakfast Club of Canada, a Canadian charity that promotes and assists the establishment and maintenance of school breakfast programs in Canada. The Breakfast Club provides more than 48 million breakfasts every year to more than 250,000 students in over 1,900 schools across Canada.

Background
Born in Verdun, Quebec, his parents broke up when he was young and he spent much of his childhood in foster care. Struggling in school, he dropped out and spent his late teens and early 20s as a smalltime drug dealer, before resolving to change his life after getting arrested and spending some time in jail in the late 1980s.

He joined a Canadian International Development Agency relief program to Mexico, and participated in 60 aid trips to Mexico and Haiti over the next five years.

Breakfast Club of Canada
In 1994, he launched a breakfast program at an elementary school in Longueuil, Quebec, which expanded into the Club des petits dejeuners du Québec. The organization further expanded into the rest of Canada in 2005 as the Breakfast Club of Canada.

In 2006, he created the Millennium Promise Summit, an annual conference of global leaders and activists on strategies to eliminate child poverty.

Honours 
In 2004, Germain was awarded the Meritorious Service Medal. In 2007, he was made a Knight of the National Order of Quebec.

In 2009, he was made a member of the Order of Canada and in 2012 he was awarded the Queen Elizabeth II Diamond Jubilee Medal.

In 2011, Correlieu Secondary School in Quesnel, British Columbia, upon learning that Germain had never completed his high school education, granted him an honorary high school diploma.

References

External links
 Breakfast Club of Canada

1964 births
Living people
Knights of the National Order of Quebec
Members of the Order of Canada
People from Verdun, Quebec
Recipients of the Meritorious Service Decoration
Canadian philanthropists
French Quebecers